Mecyclothorax carteri is a species of ground beetle in the subfamily Psydrinae. It was described by Perkins in 1917.

References

carteri
Beetles described in 1917